The 2013–14 season of the Belgian Third Divisions was the 87th season of the third-tier football league in Belgium, since its establishment in 1926.

The league is composed of 36 teams divided into two groups of 18 teams each. Teams will play only other teams in their own division.

Group A

Group B

Third Division Overall Championship

Promotion to Second Division playoffs

Quarterfinals

Semifinals

Hoogstraten relegated to Third Division.

Finals

Patro Eisden Maasmechelen promoted to Second Division.

Relegation playoffs

Grimbergen and Bornem remained in Second Division.

Belgian Third Division
Bel
3